YesFM may refer to any of three FM radio stations in the United States:
WYSS, in Sault Ste. Marie, Michigan (99.5 FM)
WYSX, in Morristown, New York (96.7 FM)
WYSZ, in Toledo, Ohio (89.3 FM)